Gortyna xanthenes, the artichoke moth, is a moth of the family Noctuidae. It was described by Ernst Friedrich Germar in 1842. It is found on the Canary Islands, the Balearic Islands, Corsica, Sardinia, Sicily and Malta as well as in Portugal, Spain, France, Italy and Greece.

References

External links

Gortyna xanthenes at Insecta.pro
Lepiforum e.V.

Moths described in 1842
Hadeninae
Moths of Europe
Taxa named by Ernst Friedrich Germar